Osho Times is a website on themes related to the spiritual teacher Osho (or Bhagwan Shree Rajneesh), and is published by the Osho International Foundation.

Background

Originally a printed monthly magazine published in Hindi and English. The magazine was established in January 1975, and at one point it had a circulation of more than 60,000. In 2000, it was being published by Tao Publishing Pvt. Ltd., in Koregaon Park, Pune, India. The magazine ceased print publication in August 2009, and became an online magazine under the same name.

References

External links
 Osho Times official website

1975 establishments in Maharashtra
2009 disestablishments in India
Defunct magazines published in India
English-language magazines published in India
Hindi-language magazines
Monthly magazines published in India
Magazines about spirituality
Magazines established in 1975
Magazines disestablished in 2009
Mass media in Pune
Online magazines with defunct print editions
Religious magazines